Andreas Nilsson may refer to:

 Andreas Nilsson (film director), Swedish film director
 Andreas Nilsson (actor), Swedish actor and voice actor
 Andreas Nilsson (handballer) (born 1990), Swedish handball player
 Andreas Nilsson (footballer) (1910–2011), Swedish footballer